The Northern Star is the student-produced daily newspaper of Northern Illinois University (NIU) in DeKalb, Ill. The Northern Star covers NIU campus news, DeKalb city and county news, NIU Huskie Sports and Northern Illinois entertainment.

History
The newspaper has published continuously since 1899. It was originally called the Northern Illinois, until 1954 when it was renamed the Northern Star. The paper became a daily (M-F) in 1965. The Northern Star Online was launched in 1995.

Publication and contents
The newspaper provides online updates daily and prints weekly on Wednesdays during the academic year and weekly during the summer sessions. Exceptions to publication are holidays, semester breaks and exam periods. The Northern Star is a member of The Associated Press, Associated Collegiate Press, College Newspaper Business and Advertising Managers, Illinois College Press Association, the DeKalb Chamber of Commerce and several other professional journalism organizations.

The Northern Star is governed by the Northern Star Publications Board.

Scholarships are available to eligible staffers.

Awards
The Northern Star honors its alumni with recognitions including a Hall of Fame, a Rising Stars award, Making A+ Difference awards and Star Innovators awards. 

In 2008, for its coverage of the February Northern Illinois University shooting, the paper received a National Pacemaker Award.

References

Student newspapers published in Illinois
Newspapers established in 1899
Northern Illinois University
1899 establishments in Illinois